Jocky is a given name. Notable people with the name include:

 Jocky Dempster (born 1948), former Scottish footballer who played for Queen of the South, Mirren and Clyde
 Jocky Petrie (chef), Scottish professional chef
 Jocky Petrie (footballer) (1867–1932), former Scottish footballer who played for Arbroath
 Jocky Robertson (1926–2004), former Scottish footballer who played for Third Lanark and Berwick Rangers
 Jocky Scott (born 1948), Scottish football coach and former player
 Jocky Wilson (born 1950), former Scottish darts champion
 Jocky Wilson Cup, professional darts team tournament, named after darts champion Jocky Wilson
 Jocky Wilson's Darts Challenge, computer game of darts, named after darts champion Jocky Wilson
 Jocky Wright (1873–1946), former Scottish footballer who played for Bolton Wanderers and The Wednesday

See also
Inspector Horse and Jocky, comic strip in the UK comic The Beano, drawn by Terry Bave
Jock (disambiguation)
Jockey, person who rides horses in horse racing or steeplechase racing

Scottish masculine given names